Woodbrook is a suburban community in New Castle County, Delaware.

Geography 
Woodbrook is located approximately three miles north of Wilmington and is part of unincorporated Brandywine Hundred of New Castle County, west of Concord Pike (U.S. Route 202) and east of Brandywine Creek State Park. It is adjacent DuPont Country Club, and has entrances from Rockland Road, Blackgates Road, and Sharpley Road. It is part of the ZIP Code Tabulation Area for 19803.

The William Young House is located in the neighborhood, the land on which is sited set aside for the historic monument during the final subdivision in 1959.

Husbands Run and its tributary Willow Run flow through the neighborhood. Many DuPont historic sites are located nearby.

History 
Woodbrook was planned as early as 1948. It is a deed-restricted planned community of 215 single-family homes, developed beginning in 1952 by Woodlawn Trustees, an organization set up by conservationist William Poole Bancroft to preserve open land around the Brandywine River and to provide affordable housing. Neighboring Sharpley, Edenridge  and Tavistock are also Woodlawn communities.

The Woodbrook Civic Association was established on January 25, 1962.

References

External links 
  Woodbrook Newsletter

Unincorporated communities in Delaware
Unincorporated communities in New Castle County, Delaware